Horacio White (April 2, 1927 – August 26, 2017) was an Argentine swimmer who competed at the 1948 Summer Olympics in the 100 m freestyle and 4 × 200 m freestyle relay, reaching the final in the latter and coming 6th.

References

1927 births
2017 deaths
Swimmers at the 1948 Summer Olympics
Olympic swimmers of Argentina
Argentine people of British descent
Argentine male freestyle swimmers
Sportspeople from Rosario, Santa Fe